Chapman Lake is a lake in Sauk County, in the U.S. state of Wisconsin.

Chapman Lake was named for Parker Chapman.

See also
List of lakes in Wisconsin

References

Lakes of Sauk County, Wisconsin